The 2010 Suwon Samsung Bluewings season was the Suwon Samsung Bluewings' fifteenth season in the South Korean K-League. The team competed in the K-League, League Cup, Korean FA Cup and the AFC Champions League as FA Cup winners.

Squad

K-League

Korean FA Cup

League Cup

Group stage

Knockout stage

Champions League

Group stage

Knockout stage

Squad statistics

Appearances and goals
Statistics accurate as of match played 7 November 2010

Top scorers

Discipline

Transfer

In

Out

Honours

Club
Korean FA Cup Winners

Individual
AFC Champions League Top Scorer:  José Mota (9 goals)
Korean FA Cup MVP:  Yeom Ki-Hun

References

 Suwon Bluewings website 

Suwon Samsung Bluewings seasons
Suwon Samsung Bluewings